Hypselodoris zephyra is a species of colourful sea slug or dorid nudibranch, a marine gastropod mollusk in the family Chromodorididae.

Distribution
This nudibranch was described from Madang, Papua New Guinea. It is found in the Western and Central Pacific Ocean.

Description
Hypselodoris zephyra has a white body with black striated lines running all over the body and upper dorsum. The mantle and foot have a purple marginal line. The gills and rhinophores are orange-red with white tips. This species can reach a total length of at least  and feeds on blue sponges from the genus Dysidea. It is similar in colour pattern to Hypselodoris nigrostriata.

References

External links
 

Chromodorididae
Gastropods described in 1999